Universal Motown Records was an American record label that operated as a division of Universal Motown Republic Group. It was the contemporary incarnation of the legendary Motown Records label, and the "urban" half of UMG, although there were some rock artists on the label (along with its sub-labels) as well.

Background
In 2005, Motown Records was merged with the urban artists on Universal Records to create Universal Motown Records, headed by former CEO of Elektra Records Sylvia Rhone, and placed under the newly created umbrella division of Universal Motown Republic Group. Motown Records began celebrating its fiftieth anniversary (January 12, 2009) in late 2008, including the release of a The Complete No. 1's boxset containing Motown #1 hits from Billboard's pop, R&B, and disco charts, reissues of classic-era Motown albums on CD, and other planned events, which were released in collaboration with Universal Music Group's catalog division.

Changes were made at Universal Motown Republic Group in 2011, and Motown Records was separated from Universal Motown Records and the umbrella label and merged into The Island Def Jam Music Group, making Universal Republic Records (now shortened back to Republic Records as of late 2012) a stand-alone label and shutting down Universal Motown Republic Group.

References

External links
 Official site

Record labels established in 2005
Record labels disestablished in 2011
American record labels
Labels distributed by Universal Music Group
Motown